The National Collegiate Cyber Defense Competition (NCCDC) is the championship event for the Collegiate Cyber Defense Competition system – the largest college-level cyber defense competition in the USA. The event is held annually in the San Antonio area.

In an effort to help facilitate the development of a regular, national level cyber security exercise, the Center for Infrastructure Assurance and Security at the University of Texas at San Antonio (UTSA) hosted the first Collegiate Cyber Defense Competition for the Southwestern region in May 2005.  On June 29, 2010, United States House legislature passed recognizing the National CCDC for promoting cyber security curriculum.

While similar to other cyber defense competitions in many aspects, the NCCDC, is unique in that it focuses on the operational aspect of managing and protecting an existing network infrastructure. While other exercises examine the abilities of a group of students to design, configure, and protect a network over the course of an entire semester, this competition is focused on the more operational task of assuming administrative and protective duties for an existing commercial network. Teams are assessed based on their ability to detect and respond to outside threats, maintain availability of existing services such as mail servers and web servers, respond to business requests such as the addition or removal of additional services, and balance security needs against business needs.

Rules
The NCCDC is operated under the rules as published by the Center for Infrastructure Assurance and Security at UTSA. The current rules can be found at Homepage.

Regional competitions
Several regional groups have formed to provide qualifying events for the NCCDC annual event. Some regions share and overlap various states. Every effort is made to make each regional event consistent with the NCCDC event.

Past competitions

See also 

 List of computer science awards

Notes

References

External links
http://seccdc.org
http://maccdc.org

Computer science competitions
Computer security